"Ne me quitte pas" ("Don't leave me") is a 1959 song by Belgian singer-songwriter Jacques Brel. It has been covered in the original French by many artists and has also been translated into and performed in many other languages. A well-known adaptation, with English lyrics by Rod McKuen, is "If You Go Away".

Background

"Ne me quitte pas" is considered by some as "Brel's ultimate classic". It was written after Brel's mistress "Zizou" (Suzanne Gabriello) threw him out of her life. Zizou was pregnant with Brel's child, but Brel refused to acknowledge the child as his own.  Zizou later had an abortion due to Brel's actions. Brel first recorded the song on 11 September 1959, and it was released on his fourth album La Valse à Mille Temps. It was published by Warner-Chappell Publishing. In 1961 a Dutch-language version sung by Brel was released on the Philips label; entitled "Laat me niet alleen", with lyrics by Ernst van Altena, it was a B-side to Marieke (also a Dutch-language version). Brel recorded "Ne me quitte pas" again as the title track of his 1972 album.

In a 1966 interview, Brel said that "Ne me quitte pas" was not a love song, but rather "a hymn to the cowardice of men", and the degree to which they were willing to humiliate themselves. He knew, he said, that it would give pleasure to women who assumed it was a love song, and he understood that.

The lyrics "Moi, je t'offrirai des perles de pluie venues de pays où il ne pleut pas" ("I'll offer you rain pearls from lands where it does not rain") are sung to a theme borrowed from the second part, Lassan (Andante), of the Hungarian Rhapsody No. 6 by the composer Franz Liszt.

Johnny Hallyday version

French singer Johnny Hallyday released a live version of this song as a single in November 1984. It was recorded during his performances at Le Zénith. The song was part of his 1984 album Johnny Hallyday au Zénith.

Critical reception 
Alain Wodrascka in his 2008 book Johnny Hallyday: les adieux du rock'cœur notes how Hallyday put in his 1984 cover of Jacques Brel's "Ne me quitte pas" his special vocal qualities, i.e. his vocals that are "full of sensuality and expression of physical strength of an indestructible man, who sings as if making love".

Track listing 
7" single Philips 880 504-7
 Side 1. "Ne me quitte pas" (5:25)
 Excerpt from the album Zénith no. 824 045-2
 Arrangement: 
 Side 2. "La garce" (Studio Version) (4:56)
 Arrangement: Éric Bouad

Other versions
French
1959:
Simone Langlois – possibly the very first recording: Brel would have passed it to her prior to recording his own version
1961:
Maysa Matarazzo in Maysa Sings Songs Before Dawn and Maysa Matarazzo 1961 (released in Argentina). released again in 1966 álbum Maysa (1966). This version was used by Pedro Almodóvar in the movie Law of Desire (1987). Also used in 2001 for the Brazilian mini-series Presença de Anita (Anita's Presence) and in 2009 miniseries Maysa: Quando Fala o Coração.
1961:
Barbara chante Brel
1965:
Nina Simone in her June 1965 I Put a Spell on You album
Frida Boccara (some versions): 1. Duet with Luis Recatero (EP Belter 51532, 1965); 2. Frida Boccara Sings – 1967, LP Melodia, made in USSR (Поёт Фрида Боккара [Д-20579-80]); 3. Place des Arts – Montreal '71 Live (2 LP Philips, 1971 and CD 2006, Canada); 4.An Evening With Frida Boccara (1978, Live at Dallas Brooks Hall, Melbourne – 2 LP Philips and some CD compilations); 5. Un jour, un enfant – posthumous CD (1999)
1967:
Sandie Shaw included the song on her third album Love Me, Please Love Me.
1970:
Vicky Leandros – Brel asked Leandros to sing this song after they met in a French TV studio. The song was released on the album Ich Bin released January 1971 and on the French album Je Suis Comme Je Suis released in Canada (October 1971)
1974:
Gigliola Cinquetti in Bonjour Paris (album CGD 65978)
Mari Trini in ¿Quien?
1979:
Irena Jarocka in Koncert, Irena Jarocka, Orchestr Karla Vagnera, Supraphon 1979
1985:
Mireille Mathieu in Les grandes chansons francaises 
1987:
Alison Moyet Appears as the B-side to "Love Letters"
1988:
Juliette Gréco in Gréco 88: Hommage à Brel
Sting live on his ...Nothing Like the Sun tour
1994:
Alison Moyet Appears as the B-side to "Getting into Something"
1995:
Isabelle Aubret in her Chante Brel album
1997:
Timna Brauer & Elias Meiri in their album "Chansons et violons"
1998:
Hugues Aufray in Hommage – Ils chantent Jacques Brel CD
Yuri Buenaventura in Herencia Africana
Miguel Bosé in 11 maneras de ponerse un sombrero CD
Faudel in the tribute album Aux suivants
2000:
Elena Kamburova in her album Дорога (The Road) CD
2001:
Natacha Atlas in her album Ayeshteni
Maria Bill sings Jacques Brel
2002:
Paloma Berganza in the Avec le temps CD
Cirque du Soleil's 2002 production Varekai features a performance of the song.
Ute Lemper in But One Day
2003:
Candan Erçetin in her album Chante Hier Pour Aujourd'hui
Bic Runga in Live in Concert with the Christchurch Symphony
2004:
In-Grid in her album La vie en rose
Angélique Beauvence in the Still...love you CD
Wende Snijders on the Quand tu Dors CD
Alcione Nazareth in the Um Barzinho, um Violão Vol. 4 CD
2005:
Mikel Laboa in the Xoriek - 17 CD.
Pierre Bachelet in the Tu ne nous quittes pas CD.
Olivier Laurent ('à la manière de Patrick Bruel, Julien Clerc, Serge Lama, Johnny Hallyday') in Ces gens-là
2006:
Estrella Morente, a flamenco singer, on her album Mujeres, whose arrangement and performance is based on Nina Simone's.
2007:
Belinda Carlisle on the Voila CD.
Florent Pagny on the album "Pagny Chante Brel"
2009:
Maria Gadú in the Maria Gadú CD & live at Vivo Altas Horas (Brazil) 19 September 2009. Used in 2010 for the Brazilian mini-series Cinquentinha.
Barbra Streisand sings a mixed French/English lyric on her album Love Is the Answer.
2010:
Brian Molko performed the song in the "I love EU" concert in Brussels.
Kellylee Evans in her album Nina
2011
Celine Dion performs the song during her Las Vegas residency show, Celine
2012
The song is featured in the Deluxe Edition of Celine Dion's album Sans attendre
Sophie Hunger on The Danger of Light (Deluxe Edition) CD
2013
Concha Buika in her album La Noche Más Larga
2014
Caro Emerald as a digital download performed in both French and English.
2017
Wyclef Jean on J'ouvert (EP).
Gela Guralia 23 June in Saint-Petersburg in both French and English

Arabic
2012: Mashrou' Leila's version "ما تتركني هيك - ne me quitte pas". Indie band from Lebanon performed the cover-version at Paleo Festival Nyon – (Chapiteau / Switzerland) in 2012.
2017: Mike Massy adapted the song in Arabic, Lebanese slang "ما تفل Ma Tfell / Ne Me Quitte Pas" and released it in his EP "Le Délire". Lyrics by Nami Moukheiber, Arranged by Mike Massy.

Armenian
1976: Onnik Dinkjian's version "Yete Heranas." Recorded by Onnik Dinkjian with John Berberian (oud) and others (all from the US) on the album "Inner Feelings of Onnik." (US release)
2015: Lilit Bleyan's version "Չթողնես երբեք": Recorded at Ardini studio (Yerevan, Armenia)
2018: Berge Turabian's version "Դու ինծ մի լքիր": Arrangements by Tigran Nanian on the album "Brel, Brassens, Ferré in Armenian" (US release)

Afrikaans
1980: Laurika Rauch's version "Moenie weggaan nie". Dutch artist Herman van Veen performed a cover-version in the 2000s.
2011: Herman van den Berg's version "Laat my by jou bly".

Belarusian
2008: Źmicier Vajciuškievič's version "Nie hublaj mianie" ("Не губляй мяне") was recorded on the album Toje što treba.

Catalan
1965: Emili Vendrell – "No em deixis tan sol"
1967: Mercè Madolell – "No te'n vagis pas"
1968: Salomé – "No em deixis mai"
2005: Albert Fibla – "No em deixis, no"

Croatian
1971: Arsen Dedić – Nemoj poći sad

Czech
1969: Eva Pilarová,  "Když mě opustíš"
1976: Naďa Urbánková, Jestli rád tě má
1977: Hana Hegerová, "Lásko prokletá"

Dutch
1961: Jacques Brel's version "Laat me niet alleen"
1968: Liesbeth List's version "Laat me niet alleen".
2013: Brigitte Kaandorp's version "Lieve koningin", an homage to (the about to be abdicating) Queen Beatrix.
2014: Sjors van der Panne as "Laat me niet alleen".

English

The pop standard "If You Go Away", with lyrics by Rod McKuen, has been covered by many artists including Ray Charles.  Different lyrics by Momus, closer to those of the original, render the song as "Don't Leave", added to all reissues of his 1986 album Circus Maximus. American duo the Black Veils translate the song as "Don't Leave Me" on their 2009 album Troubadours, which includes translations of six other French chansons. Sung by Holcombe Waller in Ryan Trecartin's "Sibling Topics (section a)" at 23:10.

1967: Shirley Bassey released a version as a single which also appeared on her album And We Were Lovers, re-issued 1973 as "Big Spender".
1967: Dusty Springfield popularized a multi-lingual French/English version for her album The Look of Love
1967: Lana Cantrell, for her album And Then There Was Lana
1967: Kim Weston, for her MGM album For The First Time
1967: The Seekers, for their album Seekers Seen in Green
1968: Glen Campbell recorded a version on his album Wichita Lineman
1969: Frank Sinatra released a version on his album My Way
1969: Scott Walker recorded a cover of "Ne me quitte pas" on his third solo album Scott 3, originally released in 1969. Scott Walker released various Brel covers on the albums Scott 1, 2 & 3, which were translated by Mort Shuman.
1971: Neil Diamond covered "Ne me quitte pas" on his seventh studio album "Stones".
1974: Terry Jacks covered "If You Go Away" and released it as a stand-alone single.
1982: Marc Almond covered the track with his band Marc and the Mambas on the album Untitled
1989: Marc Almond recorded a second cover on his album Jacques, an hommage to Jacques Brel.
2000: Emilíana Torrini for her promotional album Rarities
2002: Patricia Kaas recorded the song for her album Piano Bar. This version was featured in the movie And Now... Ladies and Gentlemen.
2003: Shirley Horn, for her final album May the Music Never End
2003: Cyndi Lauper recorded a version for her album At Last
2006: Art of Time Ensemble recorded a version with vocalist Martin Tielli on their debut album Live in Toronto.
2009: Barbra Streisand recorded a multi-lingual French/English version for her album Love Is the Answer
2010: Julie Christmas recorded a version for her album The Bad Wife.
2011: Dalis Car recorded for the album InGladAloneness
2013: Tout Va Bien recorded a version which was released as a single on iTunes.
2014: Storm Large in her album "Le Bonheur"
2014: Caro Emerald as a digital download performed in both French and English.
2015: Lauryn Hill for the album Nina Revisited… A Tribute to Nina Simone.

Finnish
1968: Brita Koivunen "Jos nyt menet pois"
1979: Toni Edelmann "Ethän lähde pois"
1984: Susanna Haavisto "Ala vetää vaan"
1985: Vera Telenius "Ala vetää vaan"
2010: Samuli Edelmann "Ethän lähde pois"

West Frisian
2007: Douwe Heeringa "Leafste bliuw by my"

German
1963: Marlene Dietrich "Bitte geh nicht fort"
1976: Klaus Hoffmann "Geh nicht fort von mir"; "Bitte geh nicht fort" (1997)
1977: Markus Pol Lass mich nicht allein

Greek
 1971: Vicky Leandros in the album Pes mou pos mporeis (Tell me how you can).
 1979: Yiannis Parios in the LP Tha Me Thymithis (You will remember me), with the title "Mi me afinis mi" (Don't leave me, don't).
1996: Haris Alexiou in her live album: Gyrizontas ton kosmo (During my world tour).
 2007: Yiannnis Parios' live rendition of the aforementioned song.
 2009: Vassilikos in the album "Vintage"

Hebrew
1974: Dani Granot Sang "Ana Al Telchi" - Please don't go(אנא אל תלכי), a translation by Dafna Eilat, in his album Shkiot Nashim Vechol Hashar.
1992: The late Yossi Banai sings Al telchi mikan - Don't go from here(אל תלכי מכאן), a translation by Naomi Shemer, in the Im neda' le'ehov – Songs of Jacques Brel (אם נדע לאהוב) record
2001: Rita and Rami Kleinstein sang the same Hebrew version live in their tour, that was later released on a CD, Rita Rami on Stage
2008: Itay Pearl Israeli composer Itay Pearl, wrote a song as a response to the original Jacques Brel version.
2009: Shlomi Shaban: Translated by Dory Manor, Al Telchi Achshav - Don't go now (אל תלכי עכשיו).
2011: Miri Mesika sings the translation by Naomi Shemer, in her  http://www.israel-music.com/miri_mesika/live_acoustic_at_zappa

Italian
1962: Gino Paoli, "Non Andare Via"
1970: Dalida, "Non Andare Via"
1970: Patty Pravo, "Non Andare Via"
1985: Ornella Vanoni, "Non Andare Via"
2006: Petra Magoni & Ferruccio Spinetti, "Non Andare Via"

Japanese
1979: Hiromi Iwasaki's version "" from her album 

Macedonian
1960: Nina Spirova, "Ако отидеш" (lat. "Ako otideš")

Persian
 2021: Alireza Tehrani, "Age To Beri / اگه تو بری / If You Go Away"

Polish
 1976: Irena Jarocka & Jacques Hustin, "Nie zostawiaj mnie/Ne me quitte pas"
 1986: Irena Jarocka, "Nie zostawiaj mnie"
 1995: Michał Bajor, "Nie opuszczaj mnie"
 1995: Edyta Górniak, "Nie opuszczaj mnie"
 1998: Edyta Jungowska, "Nie opuszczaj mnie"
 2007: Joanna Jabłczyńska, "Nie opuszczaj mnie"

Portuguese
 1974: Simone de Oliveira (Portugal) "Não me vás deixar (Ne Me Quitte Pas)" (J. Brel – David Mourão Ferreira) in Nunca mais a Solidão
 1979: Altemar Dutra (Brazil) "Se Você Partir" – Se Você Partir (Ne Me Quitte Pas) (J.Brel – Romeo Nunes)
 1989: Raimundo Fagner (Brazil) "Não Me Deixes" – Não Me Deixes (Ne Me Quitte Pas) (J. Brel – Fausto Nilo)

Russian
 1973: Radmila Karaklajić's version "Если ты уйдёшь" (Melodiya, LP album "Радмила Караклаич" USSR 1973)
 1995: Igor Ivanov's version "Если ты уйдёшь" (CDRDM 502065, CD album "Игорь Иванов – Я тебя помню", 1995)
 2001: Mumiy Troll's version "Когда ты уйдёшь"

Serbian
1968: Anica Zubović's version "Ako odeš ti" (Beograd Disk, EP "Anica" Yugoslavia 1968)

Slovene
2009: Branko Završan "Saj ne boš kar šla"
2011: Jure Ivanušič "Ne zapusti me"

Spanish
1969: Matt Monro "No me dejes no", Album: "Todo Pasará"
?: Alma Ritano "No me dejes no"
1977: Angélica María "No me dejes no"
1997: Sandy Aruba's salsa music version "No Me Dejes Mas"
2011: Fito Páez: "Ne me quitté pás", Album: "Canciones para Aliens"

Swedish
1968: Lill Lindfors: "Om du går din väg" in Kom i min värld
1982: Tommy Körberg & Stefan Nilsson: "Du får inte gå" in Tommy Körberg & Stefan Nilsson tolkar Jacques Brel
2000: Maria Stoltz: "Du Får Inte Gå" in Franska chansoner

Turkish
 1972: Zeki Müren "Beni Terketme"
 1975: Ertan Anapa "Beni Terketme"
 1977: Lale Belkıs "Beni Bırakma"

Yiddish
 2008: Mendy Cahan's version "לאָז מיך נישט אַלײן"

Multilingual
 2005: Lam Nhat Tien's version of "Ne Me Quitte Pas": Người Yêu Nếu Ra Đi in French and Vietnamese, from the album Giờ Đã Không Còn Nữa.
 2007: Das Blaue Einhorn's version of "Ne Me Quitte Pas" in French and German, from their album Verkauf dein Pferd – Lieder vom Halten und Lassen (2007)
 2014: Caro Emerald as a digital download performed in both French and English.

Instrumental
1982: Richard Clayderman, for his 1982 album 'Reveries No.2'
1985: Toots Thielemans and Fred Hersch, live at Lulu White's Mahogany Hall Bourbon Street, New Orleans
2005: Charles Lloyd, in the album Jumping the Creek
2008: Farhad Besharati, in the album Zenith

In popular culture
The song was used in season 1 episode 19 of the critically acclaimed TV show Person of Interest and in the final episode of Mr. Robot. It was also used in season 1 finale of The Leftovers. "Ne Me Quitte Pas" was used by Spanish filmmaker Pedro Almodóvar in his sixth film, Law of Desire, in a striking performance by Brazilian singer Maysa Matarazzo. A parody of the song and the singer, as the archetypal chansonnier, was performed by Italian actor Gigi Proietti. Claudio Corneiro performed a clown act with this song in Cirque du Soleil's Varekai.
It is also the name of an episode in the series Ramy.

References

External links
 SecondHandSongs cover hierarchy for 'Ne Me Quitte Pas'
 Brelitude - List of 'Ne me quitte pas' cover versions

See the article "List of Jacques Brel cover versions".
Alfred de Grazia: 

Songs about heartache
Songs about parting
1959 songs
Pop ballads
Jacques Brel songs
Nina Simone songs
Demis Roussos songs
Johnny Hallyday songs
French-language songs
Natacha Atlas songs
Songs written by Jacques Brel
Caro Emerald songs
2014 singles
Marlene Dietrich songs
1950s neologisms
Quotations from music